Travelin' at the Speed of Thought is an album by the American R&B group the O'Jays, released in 1977 on Philadelphia International Records. Unusual for the time, there had been no advance single release from the album; the only single subsequently issued, "Work on Me", became a #7 R&B hit but failed to reach the pop listings, making this the first O'Jays PIR album without a top 100 pop single. Travelin' at the Speed of Thought peaked at #6 on the R&B chart and reached #27 on the pop chart. The album achieved a gold certification.

In 2004, Travelin' at the Speed of Thought was reissued by Demon Music in the UK in a double package with the O'Jays' previous album, Message in the Music.

Production
The album was recorded at Sigma Sound Studios in Philadelphia, with six of the eight tracks written and produced by Kenny Gamble and Leon Huff. Travelin' at the Speed of Thought is the first O'Jays album to feature vocals from Sammy Strain, who in 1975 had been brought into the group as the replacement for the then-terminally ill William Powell. Powell's death from cancer in May 1977 coincided with the release of the album.

Track listing
All songs written by Kenneth Gamble and Leon Huff, except where noted.

Side one
"Travelin' at the Speed of Thought" - 4:59
"We're All in This Thing Together" - 4:52
"So Glad I Got You, Girl" - 3:32
"Stand Up" - 4:46

Side two
"Those Lies (Done Caught Up with You This Time)" (John Whitehead, Gene McFadden, Victor Carstarphen) - 3:45
"Feelings" (Morris Albert) - 7:11
"Work on Me" - 4:26
"Let's Spend Some Time Together" - 4:33

Personnel
Eddie Levert, Walter Williams, Sammy Strain - vocals
MFSB - horns, strings
Roland Chambers, Dennis Harris, T.J. Tindall - guitar
Charles Collins - drums
Michael "Sugar Bear" Foreman - bass guitar
Larry Washington - congas, bongos
Dennis Williams - piano
Carlton Kent - organ

References

The O'Jays albums
Philadelphia International Records albums
1977 albums
Albums produced by Kenneth Gamble
Albums produced by Leon Huff
Albums recorded at Sigma Sound Studios